Forks of Ivy is an unincorporated community in Buncombe County, North Carolina, United States.

The elevation is 1,965 feet.

References

Unincorporated communities in Buncombe County, North Carolina
Unincorporated communities in North Carolina